The Type 93 13 mm heavy machine gun (Japanese: 九三式十三粍機銃 Kyū-san Shiki Jū-san Mirimētoru Kijū), known to the Imperial Japanese Army as the Type Ho 13 mm AA machine cannon (Japanese: ホ式十三粍高射機関砲 Ho Shiki Jū-san Mirimētoru Kōsha Kikanhō), was a license-built version of the Hotchkiss M1930 machine gun used by the Empire of Japan during the Second Sino-Japanese War and World War II.

References 

Weapons and ammunition introduced in 1933
World War II weapons of Japan
Heavy machine guns
Anti-aircraft guns of Japan
World War II artillery of Japan
Machine guns of Japan